Lame Johnny Creek is a stream in the U.S. state of South Dakota. It is mostly located in Custer County, with its mouth located in Northern Fall River County. Its mouth is located on the Cheyenne River, which itself flows into the Missouri River about 130 miles downstream. Parts of the river are located in Custer State Park.

Lame Johnny Creek was named after Cornelius Donahue, a highway robber who was lynched by a mob near the creek.

See also
List of rivers of South Dakota

References

Rivers of Custer County, South Dakota
Rivers of Fall River County, South Dakota
Rivers of South Dakota